Total Control may refer to:
 Total Control (Yo-Yo album), 1996
 Total Control (John Norum album), 1987
 Total Control (EP) by Missy Higgins]], 2022
 "Total Control" (song), the second single by The Motels, 1979
 Total Control (band), an Australian post-punk/garage rock band
 Total Control, media gateway technology created by U.S. Robotics and used by CommWorks Corporation
 Total Control, a MIDI controller for DJs produced by Numark Industries
 Total Control (novel), by David Baldacci, 1997
 Total Control (video game), a 1995 Russian game
 Total Control (TV series), 2019